The 2016–17 SPFL Development League was the 19th season of the highest youth Scottish football league and the third season under the "Development League" format. It began in August 2016 and ended in May 2017.

Changes
The league remained at 17 teams. All twelve 2016–17 Scottish Premiership clubs participated in the league, with Dundee United, Dunfermline Athletic, Falkirk, Hibernian and St Mirren making up the numbers. Eligible players were those born in 1997 or later, but five players of any age were permitted in the matchday squad of 18.

League table

Matches
Teams played each other twice, once at home, once away.

The result of a match between Dunfermline and Motherwell on 21 February was annulled, and a 3–0 win awarded to Motherwell, because Dunfermline fielded a player who was under suspension from the Scottish Football Association.

Top scorers

References

External links
SPFL

Development
SPFL Development League